Antelope Township, Nebraska may refer to one of the following places in Nebraska:

 Antelope Township, Harlan County, Nebraska
 Antelope Township, Holt County, Nebraska
 Antelope Township, Franklin County, Nebraska

See also
Antelope Township (disambiguation)

Nebraska township disambiguation pages